Valeriy Vardazar Saharyan born on 21 June 1978 in Tomsk, Russian SFSR, Soviet Union — Founder and CEO of "Armenia production" production holding.

Biography 

Valeriy Saharyan was born on 21 June 1978 in Tomsk Russian Soviet Federative Socialist Republic.

Founder and CEO of "Armenia production" production holding.

Founder and CEO of "AP Cinema"

Obtained a university degree in law.

Father - Vardazar Saharyan.

Mother - Ruzanna Saharyan.

Saharyan married Gohar Eghiazaryan in 1999. They have two children: daughter Eva and son Narek.

Professional career 

 1996 -1998  – correspondent at IGTRC ”Mir” .
 1996–present  – member of Union of Journalists of Armenia.
 1999-2001 – head of the regional network  development department at "Pushkinskaya Ploshchad” Print House.
 2000-2001  – adviser to O. M. Poptsov, TV Tsentr.
 2000  – founder of  “Armenia Production” production center.
 2001  – head of the organizing commission of the festivities marking the 1700th anniversary of the adoption of Christianity as state religion in Armenia (Moscow).
 2003  – started the Young Performers Competition project - “The Song of the Year of Armenia” 
 2004  – founded the annual professional music award in the sphere of Armenian music industry - “Anelik”, “Tashir”, “ ARMENIA MUSIC AWARDS” (Kremlin Palace). 
 2007 – cofounder of the stand-up comedy  “Bla Bla Show” (together with his friends Ghevond and Sarik Andreasyans ). Starting from 2008 the “Bla Bla Show” was broadcast on “Ren TV”.
 2009  – honorary academician at the Academy of Radio and Television of Armenia.
 2009 – producer of the famous pop singer Eva Rivas.
 2010 – organization of Eva Rivas's participation  in Eurovision Song Contest.
 2011 – participation in the creation of the film “Happy New Year, Moms”, directed by Sarik Andreasyan.
 2012 – founded the film production company «ap cinema».
 In 2012 the world-renowned actor Alain Delon visited Armenia and the Russian Federation at Valeriy Saayan’s invitation.
 In 2013 Saaryan started the project of a feature film dedicated to the Armenian genocide. The film “Patient”, featuring world famous stars, tells the story of life of the greatest Armenian composer Komitas.
 In 2014 Valeriy Saayan was awarded a Silver Cross by the Union of Armenians of Russia for many years of diligent and dedicated work, and a huge contribution to culture.

References

External links 
 Official web-site of “Armenia Production”
 Official web-site of «Armenia Music Awards»
 Valeriy Saharyan: «We were banned to go to Baku at our own risk
 	The premiere screening of the film “Happy New Year, Moms” in Yerevan 
 	Adrien Brody, Dustin Hoffman, Alain Delon may play roles in a new film  about the Armenian Genocide
 Alain Delon in Yerevan recalls Ashod Malakian, invites Armenian journalist act in film
 The general producer and organizer of the cultural soiree Valeriy Saharyan announced that the upcoming concert dedicated to the 300th anniversary of the greatest Armenian ashough  Sayat-Nova is an unprecedented event
  Open meeting with Valeriy Saharyan
 «ARMENIA» MUSIC AWARDS 2013 
 Turkey will turn the centennial of the Armenian Genocide into a movie battle
 100 LIVES Valeriy Saharyan
 100 LIVES Valeriy Saharyan

Projects
06.05.01 - concert dedicated to the 1700th anniversary of the adoption of Christianity as state religion in Armenia
24.02.02 - solo concert of Gurgen Dabaghyan
26.05.02 - gala concert “To you Armenia"
20.09.02 - gala concert “To you Armenia II"
01.12.02 - Aram Asatryan “5 Years Later” (5 Tari Ants)
01.03.03 - “The Song of the Year of Armenia”
17.05.03 - Jivan Gasparyan
03.07.03 - “Garni” (Canada)
25.09.03 - “The Song of the Year of Armenia”
18.12.03 - the final of “The Song of the Year of Armenia”
09.03.04 - the 1st round of “The Song of the Year of Armenia 2004”
10.04.04 - Tata Simonyan feat Lyubov Uspenskaya
03.11.04 - the semi-final of  “The Song of the Year of Armenia 2004”
08.11.04 - musical soiree of Tatevik Aghamiryan’s authorial songs
18.12.04 - the final of “The Song of the Year of Armenia 2004”
16.02.05 - Tata Simonyan’s concert "Road" (Tchanaparh)
10.04.05 - musical and humorous programme  “Armenian Radio Broadcasts”
22.05.05 - the  second elimination round, the  semifinal of  “The Song of the Year of Armenia”
09.04.06 - The first national award in the sphere of Armenian  Show Business “Anelik 2006”
20.05.06 - Nune Yesayan - "Nune Yesayan LIFE"
27.08.06 - the final of the  Young Performers Competition " The Song of the Year of Armenia -2006"
15.04.07 - the second national music award in the sphere of Armenian Show Business in the Diaspora  "Tashir-2007"
06.04.08 - the third national music award in the sphere of Armenian Show Business in the Diaspora  "Tashir -2008"
04.04.09 - the fourth national music award in the sphere of Armenian Show Business in the Diaspora  "Tashir -2009"
18.04.09 - the fifth national music award in the sphere of Armenian Show Business in the Diaspora  "Tashir 2010"
09.12.10 - Concert of Michael Tariverdiev’s music “Nostalgia for the Real”
16.04.11 - the sixth national award in the sphere of Armenian music industry "Armenia Music Awards" 2011
07.04.12 - VII annual national music award  «Armenia» Music Awards
20.04.13 - VIII annual national music award «Armenia» Music Awards
20.10.13 - the concert of the honored «Sayat-Nova» ensemble
06.04.14 - IX annual national music award «Armenia» Music Awards

Armenian television producers
People from Tomsk
Russian people of Armenian descent
1978 births
Living people